Androtomy ("dissection of a male" in Ancient Greek) is the dissection of the human body. Another term for it is anthropotomy "dissection of a human". Androtomy is to be distinguished from zoötomy "dissection of an animal".

The first recorded dissection of the human body in the Western world took place in ancient Alexandria by Herophilus and Erasistratus.  Though none of their writings have come down to us, other medical writers recorded what they had discovered.

One such writer was Celsus who wrote in On Medicine I Proem 23, "Herophilus and Erasistratus proceeded in by far the best way: they cut open living men - criminals they obtained out of prison from the kings and they observed, while their subjects still breathed, parts that nature had previously hidden, their position, color, shape, size, arrangement, hardness, softness, smoothness, points of contact, and finally the processes and recesses of each and whether any part is inserted into another or receives the part of another into itself."

Galen was another such writer who was familiar with the studies of Herophilus and Erasistratus.

See also
 Vivisection
 Autopsy
 Forensics
 Andreas Vesalius, founder of modern anatomy
 Jean-Joseph Sue, 18th century surgeon and anatomist

References
 C. Celsus, On Medicine, I, Proem 23, 1935, translated by W. G. Spencer (Loeb Classics Library, 1992).

External links
The Free Dictionary

Anatomy
History of anatomy